Northfield is a civil parish in Sunbury County, New Brunswick, Canada.

For governance purposes it is divided between the village of Minto and the local service district of the parish of Northfield, both of which are members of Regional Service Commission 11 (RSC11).

Origin of name
William F. Ganong states that the parish was named for its position in the county. The origin may be simpler, as Northfield was the northern polling district of Sheffield Parish before it was erected.

History
Northfield was erected in 1857 from Sheffield Parish.

Boundaries
Northfield Parish is bounded:

 on the northeast by the Northumberland County line, beginning at a point about 2.6 kilometres northwesterly of Cains River, then running southeasterly;
 on the southeast by the Queens County line;
 on the southwest by a line beginning on the Queens County line about 2 kilometres southwesterly of the Minto Dump Road, then running north-northwesterly along the prolongation of the eastern line of a grant to S. B. Corey on the northern side of Route 10 in New Zion, passing about 500 metres west of Colwell Street, to the Maugerville Parish line about 300 metres northwesterly of the mouth of Barton Brook;
 on the northwest by the prolongation of the southeastern line of a grant to Nathaniel Underhill and D. Palmer Jr. on the Saint John River, about 225 metres upstream of the foot of Middle Island, running northeasterly to the starting point.

Communities
Communities at least partly within the parish; bold indicates an incorporated municipality

 Cantor
 Duffys Corner
 Hardwood Ridge
 Humphrey Corner
 New Avon
 New England Settlement
 New Zion
 North Forks
 Minto
 North Minto
 Slope Road

Bodies of water
Bodies of water at least partly in the parish:

 North Forks Stream
 Doherty Creek
 Newcastle Creek
 Salmon Creek
 Dorsey Lake
 Jehu Lake

Demographics
Parish population total does not include portion within Minto

Population
Population trend

Language
Mother tongue (2016)

See also
List of parishes in New Brunswick

Notes

References

Parishes of Sunbury County, New Brunswick
1857 establishments in New Brunswick